The 2012 Metro Atlantic Athletic Conference men's basketball tournament took place from March 2–5, 2012 at the MassMutual Center in Springfield, Massachusetts.  The tournament will be held in Springfield through 2014. The tournament was previously held at Webster Bank Arena in Bridgeport, Connecticut. Loyola (MD) defeated Fairfield 48–44 to clinch the title and a berth in the 2012 NCAA tournament. Loyola received a No. 15 seed and were defeated by No. 2 seed Ohio State 78–59.

Iona also received an at-large bid into the NCAA Tournament. They played in the No. 14 seed First Four game against BYU. BYU set a record for the largest comeback in an NCAA tournament game, as they were down by 25 points at one point and came back to beat Iona 78–72. The largest previous deficit overcome in the tournament was 22 points by Duke against Maryland in the 2001 national semifinals.

Bracket

References

MAAC men's basketball tournament
Basketball in Springfield, Massachusetts
2011–12 Metro Atlantic Athletic Conference men's basketball season
MAAC Men's Basketball
Sports competitions in Springfield, Massachusetts
21st century in Springfield, Massachusetts
College basketball tournaments in Massachusetts